Comal Springs are the largest concentration of naturally occurring freshwater springs in Texas.  They are located in the city of New Braunfels and are the result of water percolating through the Edwards Aquifer formation.

History
The springs were historically a magnet for the indigenous population of the region, often Tonkawas.  The first Spanish explorer to visit the springs was Damián Massanet in 1691.  The site was later home to a Spanish mission.  Spanish settlers eventually called the site "Las Fontanas".  The area has been home to a mixture of recreational and commercial endeavors, including Landa Park.

Geology and natural history
The Comal Springs are fed by the Edwards Aquifer, a large karst aquifer that runs through most of central Texas.  The aquifer consists of porous, water-bearing limestone features which channel rainfall and surface runoff from the aquifer's recharge zone down to various discharge zones, including the springs.

The Comal Springs are home to a variety of unique plant and animal life.  One notable example is the Fountain Darter (Etheostoma fonticola). In addition to the association of groundwater availability with this locale along the Balcones Fault, the area is also considered an ecological dividing line for occurrence of some species; for example, the California Fan Palm, Washingtonia filifera occurs only at or west of Comal Springs, i.e. Balcones Fault zone.

See also
 Comal River
Guadelupe River

References
 Gunnar Brune. 1981. Springs of Texas, Vol. 1, Fort Worth: Branch-Smith
 C. Michael Hogan. 2009. California Fan Palm: Washingtonia filifera, GlobalTwitcher.com, ed. Nicklas Stromberg
 . 2008

Line notes

External links
 Edwards Aquifer Authority
 Edwards Aquifer: Comal Springs
 Detailed video tour Comal Springs Detailed video and narration of Comal Springs on Youtube.com

Rivers of Comal County, Texas
New Braunfels, Texas
Springs of Texas